ACBA may refer to:

 Academy of Comic Book Arts, an American professional organization
 Aéro Club du Bas Armagnac, a large French aero club
 American Cavy Breeders Association
 American College of the Building Arts in Charleston, South Carolina